Tromedja, Tromeđa or Tromegja (meaning "tripoint") may refer to:
Tromedja (mountain), mountain ion the tripoint of Albania, Kosovo and Montenegro;
Tromegja, a village in North Macedonia.